Rolex is a Swiss luxury watch manufacturer based in Geneva, Switzerland.

Rolex may also refer to:

 Rolex (food), a popular food item in Uganda, combining an egg omelette and vegetables wrapped in a chapati
 Rolex Tower, a 59-floor tower in Dubai, United Arab Emirates

Music 
 "Rolex" (song), a 2017 single by American duo Ayo & Teo
 "Rolex", a 2019 song by German rapper Capital Bra on the album CB6
 "Rolex Sweep", a 2008 song by British grime artist Skepta
 "Wearing My Rolex", a 2008 single from British grime artist Wiley
 Comunisti col Rolex, a 2017 collaborative album by Italian hip hop artists J-Ax and Fedez

Sports

Golf
 Rolex Golf Classic, a golf tournament held in Japan from 1968 to 1973
 Rolex Masters, a golf tournament held in Singapore from 1973 to 1998
 Rolex Trophy, a golf tournament on the Challenge Tour in Geneva, Switzerland

Tennis
 Paris Masters, a tennis tournament sponsored as the Rolex Paris Masters since 2017
 Rolex Monte-Carlo Masters, an annual tennis tournament in Roquebrune-Cap-Martin, France
 Shanghai Masters (tennis), a tennis tournament sponsored as the Shanghai Rolex Masters

Organisms and species 
 , species of insect from Broscosoma
 , species of insect from Deltocolpodes
 , species of insect from Leistus
 , species of insect from Pheropsophus
 , species of insect from Pterostichus

See also